This article contains a list of the Dutch TV series Bassie & Adriaan. The series ran from 1978 to 1996 and had a total of 144 episodes, as well as a series of educational shorties. These shorties consisted out of 36 episodes with a length of 5 minutes each.

Episodes

Season 8: Bassie & Adriaan en de geheime opdracht (1992)

Season 9: Bassie & Adriaan en de reis vol verassingen (1994)

Season 10: Bassie & Adriaan met liedjes uit grootmoeders tijd (1995)

Specials

Shorties (1984, 1986, 1990)

TV movies (1987/1992/1994)

References 
 Beeld en Geluid 1 
 Beeld en Geluid 2 
 Official site

Bassie and Adriaan